The following is an alphabetical list of articles related to the U.S. State of New Hampshire.

0–9 

.nh.us – Internet second-level domain for the state of New Hampshire
1st New Hampshire Volunteer Regiment
2nd New Hampshire Volunteer Regiment
3rd New Hampshire Volunteer Regiment
9th State to ratify the Constitution of the United States
14th New Hampshire Volunteer Regiment
45th parallel north
1940 New Hampshire earthquakes

A
Adjacent states and province:

Agriculture in New Hampshire
Airports in New Hampshire
Allen, Ethan
Amusement parks in New Hampshire
Appalachian Mountains
Appalachian Mountain Club
Appalachian Trail
Arboreta in New Hampshire
commons:Category:Arboreta in New Hampshire
Archaeology of New Hampshire
:Category:Archaeological sites in New Hampshire
commons:Category:Archaeological sites in New Hampshire
Architecture of New Hampshire
Area codes in New Hampshire
Art museums and galleries in New Hampshire
commons:Category:Art museums and galleries in New Hampshire
Astronomical observatories in New Hampshire
commons:Category:Astronomical observatories in New Hampshire

B
Bedel's Regiment
Boston-Cambridge-Quincy, MA-NH Metropolitan Statistical Area
Boston-Worcester-Manchester, MA-RI-NH Combined Statistical Area
Botanical gardens in New Hampshire
commons:Category:Botanical gardens in New Hampshire
Buildings and structures in New Hampshire
commons:Category:Buildings and structures in New Hampshire

C

Capital of the State of New Hampshire
Capital punishment in New Hampshire
Capitol of the State of New Hampshire
Caves of New Hampshire
commons:Category:Caves of New Hampshire
Census statistical areas in New Hampshire
Chase, Salmon P., Chief Justice of the U.S. Supreme Court
Cities in New Hampshire
Citizens Action for Southern New Hampshire
Climate of New Hampshire
Climate change in New Hampshire 
Cog railway
Cohos Trail
Colleges and universities in New Hampshire
Colonial governors of New Hampshire
Communications in New Hampshire
commons:Category:Communications in New Hampshire
Concord, New Hampshire, state capital since 1808
Connecticut Lakes

Constitution of the State of New Hampshire
Counties of the State of New Hampshire
Belknap County
Carroll County
Cheshire County
Coos County
Grafton County
Hillsborough County
Merrimack County
Rockingham County
Strafford County
Sullivan County
commons:Category:Counties in New Hampshire
County name etymologies
Covered bridges of NH (List of)
Crawford Notch
Crawford Notch State Park
Culture of New Hampshire
:Category:New Hampshire culture
commons:Category:New Hampshire culture

D
Dartmouth College
Defunct placenames of New Hampshire
New Hampshire Democratic primary
Demographics of New Hampshire
New Hampshire Department of Justice
New Hampshire Department of Safety
New Hampshire Department of Transportation

E
Economy of New Hampshire
:Category:Economy of New Hampshire
commons:Category:Economy of New Hampshire
Education in New Hampshire
:Category:Education in New Hampshire
commons:Category:Education in New Hampshire
Elections in the state of New Hampshire
:Category:New Hampshire elections
commons:Category:New Hampshire elections
Environment of New Hampshire
commons:Category:Environment of New Hampshire
Exeter, New Hampshire, capital of the revolutionary government 1775–1776, state capital 1776-1808

F

Flag of the State of New Hampshire
Forts in New Hampshire
Fort at Number 4
Fort Wentworth
:Category:Forts in New Hampshire
commons:Category:Forts in New Hampshire
Fourth Connecticut Lake
Fourth Connecticut Lake Trail
Free State Project

G

New Hampshire General Court
Geography of New Hampshire
:Category:Geography of New Hampshire
commons:Category:Geography of New Hampshire
Ghost towns in New Hampshire
:Category:Ghost towns in New Hampshire
commons:Category:Ghost towns in New Hampshire
Government of the state of New Hampshire  website
:Category:Government of New Hampshire
commons:Category:Government of New Hampshire
Governor of the State of New Hampshire
List of governors of New Hampshire
List of colonial governors of New Hampshire
Golf clubs and courses in New Hampshire
New Hampshire Grants
Great Seal of the State of New Hampshire
Gun Owners of New Hampshire

H
Heritage railroads in New Hampshire
commons:Category:Heritage railroads in New Hampshire
High Huts of the White Mountains
High schools in New Hampshire
Highway routes in New Hampshire
Highway System of New Hampshire
Hiking trails in New Hampshire
commons:Category:Hiking trails in C
History of New Hampshire
Indigenous peoples
English Pannaway Plantation, since 1623
English Colony of Massachusetts Bay, 1628–1686
English Province of New-Hampshire, 1680–1686
English Dominion of New-England in America, 1686–1689
English Province of New-Hampshire, 1689–1707
British Province of New-Hampshire, 1707–1776
King George's War, 1740–1748
Treaty of Aix-la-Chapelle of 1748
French and Indian War, 1754–1763
Treaty of Paris of 1763
British Indian Reserve, 1763–1783
Royal Proclamation of 1763
American Revolutionary War, 1775–1783
United States Declaration of Independence of 1776
Treaty of Paris of 1783
State of New Hampshire, since 1776
War of 1812, 1812–1815
Republic of Indian Stream, 1832–1835
New Hampshire in the American Civil War, 1861–1865
:Category:History of New Hampshire
commons:Category:History of New Hampshire
Hospitals in New Hampshire

I
Images of New Hampshire
commons:Category:New Hampshire
Indian Stream, Republic of.  See also Pittsburg, NH.
Islands of New Hampshire

J

K
Kancamagus Highway

L
Lakes in New Hampshire
:Category:Lakes of New Hampshire
commons:Category:Lakes of New Hampshire
Landmarks in New Hampshire
commons:Category:Landmarks in New Hampshire
Law of New Hampshire
Law enforcement agencies in New Hampshire
LGBT rights in New Hampshire
Lists related to the State of New Hampshire:
List of airports in New Hampshire
List of census statistical areas in New Hampshire
List of cities in New Hampshire
List of colleges and universities in New Hampshire
List of counties in New Hampshire
List of dams and reservoirs in New Hampshire
List of forts in New Hampshire
List of ghost towns in New Hampshire
List of governors of New Hampshire
List of high schools in New Hampshire
List of highway routes in New Hampshire
List of hospitals in New Hampshire
List of individuals executed in New Hampshire
List of islands of New Hampshire
List of lakes in New Hampshire
List of law enforcement agencies in New Hampshire
List of museums in New Hampshire
List of National Historic Landmarks in New Hampshire
List of newspapers in New Hampshire
List of people from New Hampshire
List of power stations in New Hampshire
List of radio stations in New Hampshire
List of railroads in New Hampshire
National Register of Historic Places listings in New Hampshire
List of rivers of New Hampshire
List of school districts in New Hampshire
List of state forests in New Hampshire
List of state parks in New Hampshire
List of state prisons in New Hampshire
List of symbols of the State of New Hampshire
List of telephone area codes in New Hampshire
List of television stations in New Hampshire
List of towns in New Hampshire
List of United States congressional delegations from New Hampshire
List of United States congressional districts in New Hampshire
List of United States representatives from New Hampshire
List of United States senators from New Hampshire
Long's Regiment

M
Manchester, New Hampshire
List of mayors of Manchester, New Hampshire
Maps of New Hampshire
commons:Category:Maps of New Hampshire
Merrimack River  see also List of New Hampshire rivers
Motto of New Hampshire
Moulton, Jonathan
Mount Washington State Park
Mountains of New Hampshire
Cannon Mountain
Carter Dome
Mount Adams
Mount Eisenhower
Mount Flume
Mount Jackson
Mount Jefferson
Mount Kelsey
Mount Lafayette
Mount Lincoln
Mount Madison
Mount Monadnock
Mount Monroe
Mount Moosilauke
Mount Osceola
Mount Quincy Adams
Mount Washington
South Twin Mountain
:Category:Mountains of New Hampshire
commons:Category:Mountains of New Hampshire
Museums in New Hampshire
:Category:Museums in New Hampshire
commons:Category:Museums in New Hampshire
Music of New Hampshire
commons:Category:Music of New Hampshire
:Category:Musical groups from New Hampshire
:Category:Musicians from New Hampshire

N
National Forests of New Hampshire
commons:Category:National Forests of New Hampshire
National Historic Landmarks in New Hampshire
Natural history of New Hampshire
commons:Category:Natural history of New Hampshire
Nature centers in New Hampshire
commons:Category:Nature centers in New Hampshire
New England
New Hampshire  website
:Category:New Hampshire
commons:Category:New Hampshire
New Hampshire Academy of Science
New Hampshire Gay Men's Chorus
New Hampshire Militia
New Hampshire Snowmobile Association
New Hampshire State House
New Hampshire State Police
New Hampshire Wildlife Federation
New Hampshire's 1st State Senate District
New Hampshire's 15th State Senate District
New Hampshire's 22nd State Senate District
Newspapers in New Hampshire
NH – United States Postal Service postal code for the State of New Hampshire
Noyes Academy

O
Old Man of the Mountain
Our Last Night

P
List of New Hampshire state parks
People from New Hampshire
:Category:People from New Hampshire
commons:Category:People from New Hampshire
:Category:People by city in New Hampshire
:Category:People by county in New Hampshire
:Category:People from New Hampshire by occupation
Pinkham Notch
List of New Hampshire places
List of place names in New England of aboriginal origin
Politics of New Hampshire
:Category:Politics of New Hampshire
commons:Category:Politics of New Hampshire
Portsmouth, New Hampshire, capital of the Province of New-Hampshire 1680-1686 and 1689–1775
Presidential Range
New Hampshire primary
Prisons (state)
Protected areas of New Hampshire
commons:Category:Protected areas of New Hampshire
Province of New Hampshire (colonial)

Q

R
Radio stations in New Hampshire
Railroads in New Hampshire
Regions of New Hampshire: See list of links in box below.
Religion in New Hampshire
:Category:Religion in New Hampshire
commons:Category:Religion in New Hampshire
Republic of Indian Stream
New Hampshire Retirement System
Rivers in New Hampshire
Rivier University
Rock formations in New Hampshire
commons:Category:Rock formations in New Hampshire
Roller coasters in New Hampshire
commons:Category:Roller coasters in New Hampshire

S
School districts in New Hampshire
Scouting in New Hampshire
Settlements in New Hampshire
List of Towns in New Hampshire
Cities in New Hampshire
Townships in New Hampshire
Census Designated Places in New Hampshire
Other unincorporated communities in New Hampshire
List of ghost towns in New Hampshire
Ski areas and resorts in New Hampshire
commons:Category:Ski areas and resorts in New Hampshire
Solar power in New Hampshire
Sports in New Hampshire
commons:Category:Sports in New Hampshire
Sports venues in New Hampshire
commons:Category:Sports venues in New Hampshire
State forests in New Hampshire
State of New Hampshire  website
Government of the State of New Hampshire
:Category:Government of New Hampshire
commons:Category:Government of New Hampshire
Vermont v. New Hampshire
State parks in New Hampshire
State Police of New Hampshire
State prisons in New Hampshire
Structures in New Hampshire
commons:Category:Buildings and structures in New Hampshire
New Hampshire Superior Court
New Hampshire Supreme Court
Symbols of the State of New Hampshire
:Category:Symbols of New Hampshire
commons:Category:Symbols of New Hampshire

T
Telecommunications in New Hampshire
commons:Category:Communications in New Hampshire
Telephone area codes in New Hampshire
Television stations in New Hampshire
Theatres in New Hampshire
commons:Category:Theatres in New Hampshire
Tourism in New Hampshire  website
commons:Category:Tourism in New Hampshire
Towns in New Hampshire
Towns in New Hampshire
Transportation in New Hampshire
:Category:Transportation in New Hampshire
commons:Category:Transport in New Hampshire
Tuckerman Ravine

U
United States of America
States of the United States of America
United States census statistical areas of New Hampshire
United States congressional delegations from New Hampshire
United States congressional districts in New Hampshire
United States Court of Appeals for the First Circuit
United States District Court for the District of New Hampshire
United States representatives from New Hampshire
United States senators from New Hampshire
Universities and colleges in New Hampshire
University of New Hampshire
University System of New Hampshire
US-NH – ISO 3166-2:US region code for the State of New Hampshire

V

W
Water parks in New Hampshire
Waterfalls of New Hampshire
commons:Category:Waterfalls of New Hampshire
Whitcomb's Rangers
White Mountain National Forest
White Mountains (New Hampshire)
Wikimedia
Wikimedia Commons:Category:New Hampshire
commons:Category:Maps of New Hampshire
Wikinews:Category:New Hampshire
Wikinews:Portal:New Hampshire
Wikipedia Category:New Hampshire
Wikipedia:WikiProject New Hampshire
:Category:WikiProject New Hampshire articles
Wikipedia:WikiProject New Hampshire#Participants
Wind power in New Hampshire
Lake Winnipesaukee

X

Y

Z

See also

Topic overview:
New Hampshire
Outline of New Hampshire

New Hampshire
 
New Hampshire